Santa Rosa is a  department located in the centre of Mendoza Province in Argentina.

Districts

La Dormida 
Las Catitas 
Santa Rosa
12 de Octubre

External links
Information about Santa Rosa (Spanish)

1874 establishments in Argentina
Departments of Mendoza Province